Tierra de León or Tierras de León (Tierras de Llión in the Leonese language) is a shire (comarca) in the province of León. The city of León, capital of the province, is the biggest city in the comarca.

Municipal terms

See also
 León Airport
 Kingdom of León

External links
 Leonese City Council

Comarcas of the Province of León